Sarah Jane Smith: Dreamland is a Big Finish Productions audio drama based on the long-running British science fiction television series Doctor Who. It stars Elisabeth Sladen reprising her role as Sarah Jane Smith.

Plot 
Still reeling from recent tragic events, Sarah Jane faces one more shock as Josh stands revealed as her secret guardian angel.

When the truth behind Duke Guilliano's manuscript emerges, the dying Sir Donald offers her a place on the world's first commercial flight into space from the Nevada launch site codenamed Dreamland. He has been working on this flight since 2001, which is the key to the White Chapter's plan to intercept the rapidly approaching Mandragora comet. She accepts – convinced that the Doctor had a reason behind his decision to return her to Earth. But she wonders whether she will find what she has been searching for, out among the stars.

Following a sabotage attempt on take-off, Sarah Jane is marooned in space. But something is approaching the spacecraft.

Cast
Sarah Jane Smith – Elisabeth Sladen
Josh Townsend – Jeremy James
Natalie Redfern – Sadie Miller
Ben Kimmell – Jon Weinberg
Mission Control – Toby Longworth
Newsreader – Shaun Ley
Maude – Patricia Leventon
Sir Donald – Stephen Greif

Notes
 This is the last instalment of this series of audio plays. She returned to Doctor Who in the episode School Reunion, the same month this CD was released. The following year, The Sarah Jane Adventures premiered on television.
 This is the final full cast audio play with Sarah Jane Smith. Elisabeth Sladen died five years to the month after this CD was released.
 Stephen Greif's science fiction credits include appearing in the BBC tv series Blake's 7 in 1978, as series regular Space Commander Travis.

References

External links
Big Finish Productions – Sarah Jane Smith: Dreamland

Dreamland
2006 audio plays
Plays by David Bishop